West Devon Borough Council in Devon, England is elected every four years. Since the last boundary changes in 2015, 31 councillors have been elected from 18 wards.

Political control
The first election to the council was held in 1973, initially operating as a shadow authority before coming into its powers on 1 April 1974. Political control of the council since 1973 has been held by the following parties:

Leadership
The leaders of the council since 2011 have been:

Council elections
1973 West Devon District Council election
1976 West Devon District Council election
1979 West Devon District Council election (New ward boundaries)
1983 West Devon Borough Council election
1987 West Devon Borough Council election
1991 West Devon Borough Council election
1995 West Devon Borough Council election (Borough boundary changes took place but the number of seats remained the same)
1999 West Devon Borough Council election
2003 West Devon Borough Council election (New ward boundaries increased the number of seats by 1)
2007 West Devon Borough Council election
2011 West Devon Borough Council election
2015 West Devon Borough Council election (New ward boundaries)
2019 West Devon Borough Council election

By-election results

1999-2003

2003-2007

2007-2011

References

 By-election results

External links
West Devon Borough Council

 
Council elections in Devon
District council elections in England